Vigano San Martino is a comune (municipality) in the Province of Bergamo in the Italian region of Lombardy, located about  northeast of Milan and about  east of Bergamo.

Vigano San Martino borders the following municipalities: Albino, Berzo San Fermo, Borgo di Terzo, Casazza, Grone.

References